The E. C. Peery Building is a historic building in Scio, Oregon, United States that was built in 1881 in the Italianate style. It was listed on the National Register of Historic Places in 1998.

References

National Register of Historic Places in Linn County, Oregon
Italianate architecture in Oregon
Commercial buildings completed in 1881
1881 establishments in Oregon